Keith R. Wheeler is a Republican politician and former member of the Illinois House of Representatives. He represented the 50th District from 2015 to 2023. The 50th district included municipalities in southern Kane and Kendall counties.

After new legislative maps were drawn to fit the results of the 2020 census, Wheeler opted to seek a fifth term in the House in the new 83rd District. He lost to Democratic nominee Matt Hanson.

Illinois House of Representatives 
Wheeler was elected to the Illinois House in 2014, defeating three other Republicans in a primary and a Democrat in the general election. He was reelected in 2016, 2018, and 2020. Wheeler served as an Assistant Republican Leader.

Committee assignments 
In the 102nd General Assembly, Wheeler was the Co-Chair of the House Administrative Rules Committee. He also sat on the House Committees on Cybersecurity, Data Analytics, and IT; Executive; Labor and Commerce; Prescription Drug Affordability and Accessibility; and Public Utilities.

Electoral history

References

External links

Living people
Republican Party members of the Illinois House of Representatives
Year of birth missing (living people)
21st-century American politicians
People from Oswego, Illinois
University of Illinois Urbana-Champaign alumni